The 1927 Coupe de France Final was a football match held at Stade Olympique, Colombes on May 6, 1927, that saw Olympique de Marseille defeat US Quevilly 3–0 thanks to goals by Raymond Durand, Maurice Gallay and Jules Dewaquez.

Match details

See also
Coupe de France 1926-1927

External links
Coupe de France results at Rec.Sport.Soccer Statistics Foundation
Report on French federation site

Coupe de France Final
1927
Coupe De France Final 1927
Sport in Hauts-de-Seine
Coupe de France Final
Coupe de France Final